Songs of Cinema is the 23rd studio album by American singer Michael Bolton. The album was released on February 10, 2017 by Frontiers Records. The album contains a ballad version of Bolton's song with The Lonely Island, "Jack Sparrow". Bolton promoted the album in a guest appearance on Screen Junkies' series Honest Trailers, in a trailer for the film Willy Wonka and the Chocolate Factory.

Track listing
 "When a Man Loves a Woman" (2017 version) – 3:56
 "Stand by Me" – 2:57
 "I Got a Woman" – 3:21
 "I Will Always Love You" (duet with Dolly Parton) – 3:36
 "Old Time Rock and Roll" – 3:07
 "I Heard It Through the Grapevine" – 4:06
 "Cupid" – 3:10
 "Somewhere Over the Rainbow" – 3:28
 "As Time Goes By" – 3:17
 "Jack Sparrow" (ballad) – 1:43

Charts

References

2017 albums
Michael Bolton albums